Greycliff Prairie Dog Town State Park is a Montana state park located on the eastern edge of the community of Greycliff. The  park protects and preserves the black-tailed prairie dog.

References

External links

Greycliff Prairie Dog Town State Park Montana Fish, Wildlife & Parks
Greycliff Prairie Dog Town State Park Map Montana Fish, Wildlife & Parks

State parks of Montana
Protected areas of Sweet Grass County, Montana
Protected areas established in 1974
1974 establishments in Montana